Benthodorbis is a genus of minute freshwater snails with an operculum and a gill, aquatic gastropod molluscs or micromolluscs in the family Glacidorbidae.

Species
Species within the genus Benthodorbis include:
 Bethodorbis fultoni
 Benthodorbis pawpela

References

Glacidorbidae